The Asian flu or 1957–58 influenza pandemic was an influenza pandemic which originated in China.

Asian flu may also refer to:
 Influenza A virus subtype H2N2, the virus that caused the pandemic
 1997 Asian financial crisis

See also
 1889–1890 flu pandemic, aka Asiatic Flu, suspected of being caused by a coronavirus
 Flu pandemic
 Flu (disambiguation)